Alvaleta Guess (born November 24, 1955, Kansas City, Missouri — d. September 2, 1996, New York City, New York) was an American stage/musical theatre actress, both on and off-Broadway, but also played the occasional supporting role on television and in feature films.

She appeared on Broadway in Swinging on a Star. The show was nominated for several Tony Awards and she appeared in the Tony Awards telecast. The telecast was her last public appearance as a performer. Her sole appearance on television was in an episode ("Custody") of Law & Order.

Death
She died from breast cancer, aged 40, in New York City.

Filmography

References

External links

1955 births
1996 deaths
Actresses from Kansas City, Missouri
African-American actresses
American musical theatre actresses
Deaths from cancer in New York (state)
Deaths from breast cancer
20th-century American singers
20th-century American women singers
20th-century African-American women singers